William McKinley King (May 11, 1904 – June 1, 1946) was an American football coach. He served as the head football coach at Savannah State University from 1940 to 1941, compiling a record of 4–6–2.

Head coaching record

References

External links
 

1904 births
1946 deaths
Hampton University alumni
Iowa State University alumni
Savannah State Tigers football coaches